Radial spoke head 14 homolog is a protein that in humans is encoded by the RSPH14 gene.

Function

This gene encodes a protein with no known function but with slight similarity to a yeast vacuolar protein. The gene is located in a region deleted in pediatric rhabdoid tumors of the brain, kidney and soft tissues, but mutations in this gene have not been associated with the disease.

References

Further reading